Ottone Hamerani (1694–1768), also known as Otto Hamerani, was an Italian medallist.

Hamerani was born in Rome, Italy, the son of another medallist Giovanni Hamerani. He worked with several popes in producing coins, and was named Master of the Mint at Rome from 1734 until his death in 1768.

References

1694 births
1768 deaths
Artists from Rome
Italian medallists